Ambastaia is a genus of botiid loaches native to Mainland Southeast Asia and China. The species in this genus were formerly included in Yasuhikotakia.

Species
There are currently two recognized species in this genus:
 Ambastaia nigrolineata (Kottelat & X. L. Chu, 1987)
 Ambastaia sidthimunki (Klausewitz, 1959) (Dwarf botia)

References

Botiidae
Taxa named by Maurice Kottelat